Jasper Waalkens (born 13 February 1989 in Schijndel) is a Dutch footballer who plays as a winger for DOVO on loan from SV Spakenburg in the Dutch Tweede Divisie.

Career
Waalkens started his career with Avanti'31. At young age he was scouted by both FC Den Bosch and Willem II. Because of the commuting distance he made the choice for FC Den Bosch. A few years later Willem II was interested again to sign him. This time he made the choice for the PSV Eindhoven youth academy. In his first under-19 year he won the prize for the best player in the competition.

Although PSV wanted to give him a chance in the reserve squad, Waalkens signed a two-year deal (with option) with Willem II. August 9, 2009 he made his professional debut in the awaymatch against FC Utrecht (1–0 loss).

In the summer 2017, Waalkens joined SV Spakenburg. He was loaned out to DOVO for the 2019–20 season.

Honours

Club
NEC
Eerste Divisie (1): 2014–15

References

1989 births
Living people
Dutch footballers
Eredivisie players
Eerste Divisie players
Tweede Divisie players
Derde Divisie players
Willem II (football club) players
Helmond Sport players
FC Eindhoven players
Fortuna Sittard players
NEC Nijmegen players
Almere City FC players
SV Spakenburg players
VV DOVO players
People from Winterswijk
Footballers from Gelderland
Association football midfielders